Cyttaria is a genus of ascomycete fungi. About 10 species belong to Cyttaria, found in South America and Australia associated with or growing on southern beech trees from the genus Nothofagus. The "llao llao" fungus Cyttaria hariotii, one of the most common fungi in Andean-Patagonian forests, has been shown to harbor the yeast Saccharomyces eubayanus, which may be source of the lager yeast S. pastorianus cold-tolerance. Cyttaria was originally described by mycologist Miles Joseph Berkeley in 1842.

References

Taxa named by Miles Joseph Berkeley
Leotiomycetes genera